The Teahouse of the August Moon is a novel by Vern Sneider published in 1951. The book subsequently was adapted for a play (1953) and film (1956) with the same titles, both written by John Patrick, and later in 1970, the Broadway musical Lovely Ladies, Kind Gentlemen by Patrick and Stan Freeman. It depicts the activities of U.S. Army military government officers and personnel in occupied Okinawa following World War II. The novel was republished in 2018 by Camphor Press.

References

External links
 
 
 

1951 American novels
American novels adapted into films
American novels adapted into plays
Novels set during World War II
Novels set in Japan
G. P. Putnam's Sons books
Japan in non-Japanese culture